George Woodbridge may refer to:

 George Woodbridge (actor) (1907-1973), English actor 
 George Woodbridge (illustrator) (1930-2004), American illustrator